Celebrity Coach Trip 4, also known as Celebrity Coach Trip: Road to Benidorm was the fourth series of Celebrity Coach Trip in the United Kingdom. On 21 June 2018, It was announced by Channel 4 that Celebrity Coach Trip would return after a seven-year hiatus. The series was filmed in July 2018 immediately after the conclusion of Coach Trip: Road to Barcelona. The series began airing on E4 on 14 January 2019 for 10 episodes and concluded on 25 January 2019 with Lisa Maffia & Mutya Buena winning the series.

Contestants

Voting history

Notes
 On Day 5, Brendan announced that the vote would be a double yellow card vote, meaning each couple would vote twice.

 On Day 8, Brendan announced that from now on, the couple with the most votes would receive an instant red card.

 On Day 9, Brendan announced that all couples would vote as normal, however only one  couple's vote selected at random would count, and that the couple they had voted for would receive an instant red card. Brendan opened an envelope with Lisa & Mutya's name enclosed which meant that their vote for John & Edward gave them the red card.

The trip by day

References

Coach Trip series
2019 British television seasons
Television shows set in Spain